Sirtex Medical Limited is a medical device company, providing  radioactive treatment for inoperable liver cancer called SIR-Spheres microspheres.  Sirtex was established in 1997 in Australia and currently maintains offices and manufacturing facilities in the U.S., Australia, Germany and Singapore.  Following an acquisition by China Grand Pharmaceutical and CDH Genetech, Sirtex de-listed from the Australian Securities Exchange (ASX:SRX) on Monday, September 24, 2018.

The company is currently headed by Kevin R. Smith, who was appointed as CEO on October 16, 2019.

How the SIR-Spheres microspheres work 
When SIR-Spheres microspheres are used to treat liver cancer, the treatment is called selective internal radiation therapy (called SIRT). This is a relatively new treatment option for people suffering inoperable liver cancer. SIR-Spheres are very small radioactive beads about one third the size of a human hair width that are injected into tumors within the liver.

How they are used  
The radioactive microspheres have a half-life of about 64 hours. They are administered by a trained interventional radiologist who specializes in minimally invasive, targeted treatments. The procedure is usually performed under local sedation. A small incision is made in the patient's groin and a flexible catheter is guided into the liver through the femoral artery in the leg up to the tumor sites. The catheter is moved through the hepatic artery and positioned by the interventional radiologist to allow for targeted infusion of the SIR-Spheres microspheres to the site of the tumors. The microspheres take approximately 15 minutes to be infused, the whole procedure taking about one hour. Most patients are discharged within 24 hours.

The medical problem

Primary liver cancer 
Primary liver cancer, or hepatocellular carcinoma (HCC) is the most common form of liver cancer, responsible for about 90% of the primary malignant liver tumors in adults. Liver cancer is the sixth most common cancer in the world and the third leading cause of cancer-related deaths globally. More than 600,000 cases of liver cancer are diagnosed worldwide each year. This comprises approximately 19,000 in the US, 54,000 in Europe and 390,000 in China, Korea and Japan. The incidence of HCC is increasing due to increased rates of chronic infection with Hepatitis B and Hepatitis C in Asia. Other risk factors include iron overload, alcoholic cirrhosis and some congenital disorders. Five-year survival rates for liver cancer patients are low relative to other cancers.

Metastatic colorectal cancer 
Colorectal cancer (CRC), also called colon cancer or large bowel cancer, is the third leading cause of cancer-related death in the western world. An estimated 1.6 million people are diagnosed with the disease worldwide every year. An estimated 50% of CRC patients will show liver metastases. It is this form of metastatic colorectal cancer (mCRC) Sirtex targets with SIR-Spheres microspheres. It has been estimated that in 30-40% of patients with advanced disease, the liver is the only site of spread.

At presentation, 20-25% of patients will have clinically detectable liver metastases and up to 50% of all patients will develop liver metastases after re-section of the primary tumor within three years of follow up. Of those patients with metastatic liver disease, approximately 25% (on average) are eligible for liver re-section surgery, which represents the only potential cure available to patients. The remainder are eligible for alternative forms of treatment, namely chemotherapy and other technologies including SIR-Spheres microspheres.

Research and development 
Sirtex is currently looking at new ways to treat other forms of cancer using the SIR-Spheres technology. This research is taking place at the Australian National University (ANU) and several institutions in the US and Europe. Sirtex is also working to develop a new technology that will help improve the treatment and survival of cancer patients. At present this is focused on the three areas listed below.
 
Targeted Hyperthermia – Preparation for pre-clinical studies started in 2009 with the Australian National University in Canberra, the University of Sydney and other institutions. The aim is to establish if heating tumors will increase the effectiveness of SIR-Spheres. 
Hollow Microspheres – Sirtex has exclusive worldwide rights to hollow, biodegradable microsphere technology developed by the University of New South Wales (UNSW). The company is investigating if hollow microspheres can be used to deliver a range of therapeutic agents, including chemotherapy drugs.
Radioprotector Technology – Sirtex and the Peter MacCallum Cancer Centre in Melbourne have developed a compound that protects healthy skin from the harmful effects of exposure to radiation. This has potential benefit for a wide range of cancer patients. It could also expand the number of patients able to be treated with SIR-Spheres microspheres. It may also be used to help protect patients with head, breast or neck cancer from external beam radiation during treatment.

Results from the largest most comprehensive study to date evaluating SIRT in liver metastases from colorectal cancer were presented at ASCO in 2012, ASCO-GI 2013 and ASCO in 2014. The various subsets of the MORE study, led by Andrew S. Kennedy M.D. Physician in Chief, Radiation Oncology Sarah Cannon Research Institute Nashville Tenn., have demonstrated safety and efficacy as well as the same in treating the elderly. The most recent set of data presented at ASCO in 2014 documented the ability to predict success of SIRT using standard laboratory tests prior to treatment.

In addition, the global SIRFLOX study which completed patient recruitment in 2013 will evaluate SIR-Spheres microspheres a first-line treatment for colorectal liver metastases.

Reimbursement 
SIR-Spheres microspheres are regulated as a Medical Device. The product was approved for sale in the US in March 2002. The US Centers for Medicare and Medicaid Services (CMS) currently reimburse SIR-Spheres microspheres under Medicare Code C2616.

SIR-Spheres are covered in Australia by private insurers and reimbursed under Medicare.

In Europe, SIR-Spheres microspheres are regulated under the Active Implantable Medical Device Directive. The product received CE Mark approval in October 2002.

In the UK, patients treated with SIR-Spheres have been funded by themselves, private medical insurance or had the microspheres donated by Sirtex. A small number have been approved by the National Health Service (NHS). This is partly due to formal guidance documentation provided by the National Institute for Clinical Excellence (NICE) which questioned the clinical benefits of SIR-Spheres microspheres requiring patient consent. Since 2002, it has been a mandatory for NHS organizations in the UK to provide funding for medicines and treatment as recommended by NICE. A favorable review will see the National Health Service pay for treatment across the UK and help reimbursement in other EU countries.

Financial Performance 
On 3 September 2013, Sirtex announced that dose sales of SIR-Spheres microspheres grew a solid 21 percent with more than 4,750 doses being supplied in the Americas region for the year ending June 30, 2013. Globally, revenue was $100 million Australian dollars, up 16 percent from 2012, with net profit after tax of AU$18 million. Dose sales of SIR-Spheres microspheres grew 19 percent in fiscal year 2013, with Asia Pacific reporting growth of 29 percent and Europe, Middle East and Africa increasing nine percent. Sirtex plans to triple manufacturing capacity in 2014 with new facilities in Germany and the U.S.

See also
SIR-Spheres
Microsphere
Selective Internal Radiation Therapy

References

External links
 

Medical technology companies of Australia
Radiation therapy
Australian companies established in 1997
Companies formerly listed on the Australian Securities Exchange